The Milwaukee Open was a professional golf tournament in Wisconsin on the PGA Tour, played only in 1940. It was held August 2–4 at North Hills Country Club in Menomenee Falls, northwest of Milwaukee. Three-time major winner Ralph Guldahl shot a final round 67 (−4) to win the event at 268 (−16), two shots ahead of runner-up Ed Oliver.  It was his first victory in sixteen months, since the Masters in 1939. The purse was $5,000 with a winner's share of $1,200.

Johnny Bulla led after 54 holes at 197 (−16), a new scoring record for the tour. Playing with Guldahl, he carded a 75 (+4) in the final round and fell into a tie for fourth, four strokes back. With nine holes remaining, Bulla led Guldahl by three strokes, but then shot 39 (+3) while Guldahl made up seven strokes with 32 (−4).

The 72-hole event began on Friday, and the final two rounds were played on Sunday. North Hills later hosted the Blue Ribbon Open (1951) and the final two editions of the Milwaukee Open Invitational (1960, 1961).

Leaderboard
Sunday, August 4, 1940

Scorecard 

Final nine holes

Cumulative tournament scores, relative to par
Source:

See also
Other former PGA Tour events in Milwaukee
Blue Ribbon Open, 1951
Milwaukee Open Invitational, 1955–61
Greater Milwaukee Open, 1968–2009

References

External links
North Hills Country Club

Former PGA Tour events
Golf in Wisconsin
Sports in Milwaukee
1940 establishments in Wisconsin
1940 disestablishments in Wisconsin